The Human Rights Measurement Initiative finds that the Ivory Coast is fulfilling 55.8% of what it should be fulfilling for the right to health based on its level of income. When looking at the right to health with respect to children, the Ivory Coast achieves 78.5% of what is expected based on its current income. In regards to the right to health amongst the adult population, the country achieves only 62.1% of what is expected based on the nation's level of income. The Ivory Coast falls into the "very bad" category when evaluating the right to reproductive health because the nation is fulfilling only 26.7% of what the nation is expected to achieve based on the resources (income) it has available.

Health status

Malaria
In Ivory Coast, malaria is the leading cause of mortality among children and continues to be the top reason for medical consultations and hospitalizations. There were approximately 2.3 million presumed and confirmed malaria cases in 2015 in children under five years of age reported from health facilities. Malaria is endemic throughout Ivory Coast the entire year, with peaks during the rainy season.

The current malaria control strategy in Ivory Coast aims to reduce malaria morbidity and mortality by increasing the proportion of the population sleeping under an insecticide-treated mosquito net, of pregnant women taking sulfadoxine/pyrimethamine, and of malaria cases which are confirmed and treated in accordance with national guidelines. The strategy includes an emphasis on introducing an integrated approach to community interventions (malaria, pneumonia, and diarrhea) and a more participative and inclusive role for the private sector in combating malaria.

HIV/AIDS

According to the CIA World Factbook, in Ivory there are a total of 460,100 people who live with HIV/AIDS as of 2014.

Maternal and child health care
The 2010 maternal mortality rate per 100,000 births for Ivory Coast is 470. This is compared with 944.1 in 2008 and 580.3 in 1990. The under 5 mortality rate, per 1,000 births is 121 and the neonatal mortality as a percentage of under 5's mortality is 33. In Ivory Coast the number of midwives per 1,000 live births is 4 and the lifetime risk of death for pregnant women 1 in 44.

About 36% of women have undergone female genital mutilation (as of 2006).

Diseases and illness caused by hunger 

There are a lot of disease and illness caused by hunger. Ivory Coast decided to contain some diseases or illness in their National Development Plan. These were all problems relating to hunger. Whether it is not being able to access the right food or starving from hunger.

Diseases or illnesses that Ivory Coast wants to reduce:

Anemia in women
Stunting under the age of 5
Low birth weight
Under 5 wasting (deaths)

Hospitals

There were 1,792 medical facilities in the Ivory Coast in 2019.

See also 
 Ministry of Health and the Fight against AIDS (Côte d'Ivoire)
 COVID-19 pandemic in Ivory Coast

References

External links
 The State of the World's Midwifery - Ivory Coast Country Profile
 National Development Plan in Ivory Coast